Karosa B 952 is an urban bus produced by bus manufacturer Karosa from the Czech Republic, in the years of 2002 to 2006. Modernised version B952E was introduced in 2003.

Construction features 
Karosa B 952 is a model of the Karosa 900 series. The B 952 is unified with city bus models such as the B 951 and the B 961. The body was assembled to the skeleton, which has undergone a dip stage, sheets were galvanized and painted and then to have it installed additional components. The body is semi-self-supporting with frame and engine with manual gearbox is placed in the rear part. The engine drives only the rear axle. The front and rear axles are solid. All the axles are mounted on air suspension. On the right side are three doors (first are narrower than middle doors). Inside are used plastic Vogelsitze or Ster seats. The driver's cab is separated from the rest of the vehicle by a glazed partition. In the middle part is room for a pram or wheelchair.

Production and operation 
In 2002 it started the serial production, which lasted until 2006. Since 2003 only modernized version, Karosa B 951 E was produced, which had glass glued to skeleton, instead of glass mounted in rubber and with a better ventilation of the engine compartment.

Historical vehicles 
Any historical vehicle was not saved yet.

See also 

 List of buses

Buses manufactured by Karosa
Buses of the Czech Republic